Ardchattan and Muckairn is a civil parish within Argyll and Bute in Scotland. It lies north of Oban, bordering Loch Etive and includes Glen Ure, Glen Creran, Barcaldine, Benderloch, Connel, Bonawe and Glen Etive.  At the 2001 census, Ardchattan and Muckairn had a population of 2,443, between them.  Its name derives from the 6th-century Irish monk Saint Cathan, combined with the Goidelic element ard-, or "heights".

In the past Ardchattan has been co-joined with its neighbouring parish of Muckairn, on the other side of Loch Etive.
Its most famous landmark is Ardchattan Priory, founded as a Valliscaulian priory around the year 1230. The priory's ruins and surrounding gardens are now open to the public.

See also
 Prior of Ardchattan

Footnotes

External links
 Priory Ruins
 Priory Artifacts
 The Priory of Ardchattan – Article in the Catholic Encyclopedia

Geography of Argyll and Bute
Civil parishes of Scotland